Caiguna is a small roadhouse community located on the Eyre Highway in Western Australia. It is the second stop east of Norseman on the journey east across the Nullarbor Plain. Between Balladonia and Caiguna is a  stretch of the highway which is one of the longest straight stretches of road in the world. The unofficial Central Western Time (CWT) starts shortly east of Caiguna, heading eastward.

History
The name is an Aboriginal word possibly meaning "spear track". In 1841, Edward John Eyre's party, consisting of Eyre, a man named John Baxter and three Aboriginals including one named Wylie, travelled across the Nullarbor, leaving Fowler's Bay in South Australia. On 29 April, two of the Aboriginals killed John Baxter and disappeared into the desert, taking most of the party's supplies. Due to the terrain, Baxter could not be buried, so his remains were wrapped in a blanket and left behind, and Eyre and Wylie pressed on for another month, after which they were rescued by a French vessel off Thistle Cove near modern-day Esperance, Western Australia.

The townsite was established in 1962 to assist traffic crossing the Nullarbor for the Commonwealth Games in Perth.

During the 1960s and 1970s, Ansett and Trans Australia Airlines domestic flights used a VOR station at Caiguna as a turning point on routes between Perth and eastern Australian capitals such as Adelaide, Melbourne, and Sydney.

Present day
As with other communities along the Eyre Highway, Caiguna today consists of little more than a roadhouse. The John Eyre Motel provides roadhouse facilities including a basic caravan park, and is one of only three Nullarbor roadhouses to be open 24 hours. A landing strip is located nearby and connects to the roadhouse with a short taxiway. The John Eyre Motel hosts a  par 4 golf tee as part of the Nullarbor Links golf course.

There are several nearby attractions for people crossing the Nullabor Plain. Numerous rockholes, blowholes, and gnamma holes are located on tracks off of the Eyre Highway in the vicinity of Caiguna, including the Caiguna Blowhole, and the Jillbunya and Cardanumbi Rockholes. These features were formed by years of chemical and physical weathering of the limestone bedrock of the Nullabor Plain.

Nuytsland Nature Reserve stretches along the coast of the Great Australian Bight directly south of Caiguna and contains numerous points of interest, including a Memorial to John Baxter and Toolinna Cove.

Geography

Climate 
Caiguna experiences a steppe climate (Köppen climate classification BSk). The climate is generally mild with small seasonal variation. Summers average  highs and winters about  during afternoons. Nights are seldom hot due to the cool ocean air from the south.

References

External links

Shire of Dundas – Towns of the Eyre Highway
Nullarbor Net – Caiguna including local information.

Towns in Western Australia
Shire of Dundas
Nullarbor Plain
Roadhouses in Western Australia
Eyre Highway